The Landroche River is a tributary on the south shore of Lake Saint-Pierre which is crossed to the northeast by the St. Lawrence River. The Landroche river flows in the municipality of Baie-du-Febvre, in the Nicolet-Yamaska Regional County Municipality (MRC), in the administrative region of Centre-du-Quebec, in Quebec, in Canada.

Geography 

The main neighboring hydrographic slopes of the Landroche river are:
 north side: Lake Saint-Pierre, St. Lawrence River;
 east side: Rivière des Frères, Nicolet River, Nicolet Southwest River;
 south side: Lévesque River, Saint-François River;
 west side: Colbert River, Lévesque River, Saint-François River.

The Landroche river draws its source from agricultural streams located in the territory of the municipality of Baie-du-Febvre, almost at the limit of Saint-Elphège. The Landroche river begins at the confluence of the Roland-Lemire stream and the Geoffroy stream. This confluence is located on the municipal boundary of Saint-Elphège and Baie-du-Febvre.

The course of the river intersects Chemin du Pays-Brûlé, route 132 and Chemin des Huit.

The Landroche River flows northwest in an agricultural zone, crossing route 132. The river empties on the flats of Pierre à Chaux on the south shore of Lake Saint-Pierre, near Pointe Gabriel, north-east of the village of Baie-du-Febvre.

Toponymy 

The toponym "rivière Landroche" was made official on August 8, 1980, at the Commission de toponymie du Québec.

See also 
 List of rivers of Quebec

References 

Rivers of Centre-du-Québec
Nicolet-Yamaska Regional County Municipality